John McIntyre (born April 29, 1969) is a Canadian former professional ice hockey player who played 351 games in the National Hockey League. He played for the Toronto Maple Leafs, Los Angeles Kings, New York Rangers, and Vancouver Canucks in a career that lasted from 1989 to 1996. Internationally, McIntyre played for Canada at the 1989 World Junior Ice Hockey Championships.

Career statistics

Regular season and playoffs

International

External links 

1969 births
Living people
Canadian ice hockey centres
Canadian people of Irish descent
Guelph Platers players
Ice hockey people from Ontario
Los Angeles Kings players
Newmarket Saints players
New York Rangers players
People from Lambton County
Syracuse Crunch players
Toronto Maple Leafs draft picks
Toronto Maple Leafs players
Vancouver Canucks players